The 1984 Prix de l'Arc de Triomphe was a horse race held at Longchamp on Sunday 7 October 1984. It was the 63rd running of the Prix de l'Arc de Triomphe.

The winner was Sagace, a four-year-old horse trained in France by Patrick Biancone and ridden by Yves Saint-Martin. Sagace stayed on in tremendous style and won by 2 and 6 length from Northern Trick, stable-mate and previous year's winner All Along and Esprit du Nord in a time of 2:39.1 in a twenty-two runner field. 
Time Charter and Sun Princess showed up early in the straight, but their efforts were short-lived. Rainbow Quest was a dismal failure. Australian horse Strawberry Road ran a great race, fading out of contention only in the closing stages after having looked the winner soon after the turn for home. Northern Trick was the only serious challenger to Sagace in the final two furlongs. Her late run, though, was not enough to tear down the tough winner. All Along and Sun Princess hated the sticky ground on that day.

Race details
 Sponsor: Trusthouse Forte
 Purse: Total: 4,250,000 FF – Winner: 2,500,000 FF
 Going: Heavy
 Distance: 2,400 metres
 Number of runners: 22
 Winner's time: 2:39.1

Full result

 Abbreviations: ns = nose; shd = short-head; hd = head; snk = short neck; nk = neck

Winner's details
Further details of the winner, Sagace.
 Sex: Colt
 Foaled: 26 Mai 1980
 Country: France
 Sire: Luthier; Dam: Seneca (Chaparral)
 Owner: Daniel Wildenstein
 Breeder: Daniel Wildenstein

References

Prix de l'Arc de Triomphe
 1984
Prix de l'Arc de Triomphe
Prix de l'Arc de Triomphe
Prix de l'Arc de Triomphe